Ballard Community School District is a rural public K-12 school district in Story County, Iowa.  It includes areas in Story, Boone, and Polk counties, and the towns of Huxley, Slater, Cambridge and Kelley.  The School mascot is The Bomber Plane.

List of schools
Ballard West Elementary
Ballard East Elementary
Ballard Middle
Ballard High School

Ballard High School

Athletics
The Bombers compete in the Raccoon River Conference in the following sports:

Fall sports
Cross Country (boys and girls)
Swimming (girls)
Volleyball (girls)
Football

Winter sports
Basketball (boys and girls)
 Girls' - 2009 Class 3A State Champions 
Wrestling 
 2-time Class 2A State Champions (2008, 2009) 
Swimming (boys)

Spring sports
Track and Field (boys and girls)
 Boys' - 1994 Class 2A State Champions
Golf (boys and girls)
 Boys' - 6-time Class 3A State Champions (1997, 2001, 2007, 2008, 2009, 2010)
Tennis (boys and girls)
Soccer (girls)
Baseball
Softball
 2012 Class 3A State Champions

Facts and figures

Enrollment

See also
List of school districts in Iowa
List of high schools in Iowa

References

External links
 Ballard Community School District Website

School districts in Iowa
Education in Story County, Iowa